The laghava (from the ) is the Devanagari abbreviation sign, comparable to the full stop or ellipsis as used in the Latin alphabet.

It is used as abbreviation sign in Hindi and other Devanagari-script-based languages. For example, "Dr." is written as "", "M.Sc." as "", etc.

See also 
 。: CJK full stop
 ° : degree symbol

References 

Brahmic diacritics
Devanagari